

Peter Paul Francis Degrand (1787–1855) or P.P.F. Degrand was a French-born broker and merchant in Boston, Massachusetts, in the 19th century.

Business career
Degrand was born in Marseilles, France, and moved to Boston around 1803. He published the Boston Weekly Report in the 1820s, employing Edgar Allan Poe as a reporter. He was one of the thirteen founding members of the Boston Stock Exchange and was described by Clarence W. Barron and Joseph G. Martin as "the man to whose indomitable energy and foresight the existence of the Boston Stock Exchange is largely due". He was a major stockholder in the Western Railroad and was instrumental in securing financial aid from the state during the railroad's early years.

Personal life
Degrand lived on Pinckney Street in Beacon Hill. He was friend with President of the United States John Quincy Adams. He died on December 23, 1855 and was buried in Forest Hills Cemetery. Degrand bequeathed $120,000 to charity,  a large part of which was for the acquisition of French-language scientific texts for Harvard University.

References

Further reading

By Degrand
 PPF Degrand's Boston Weekly Report of Public Sales and of Arrivals. Boston: 1819-1828
 Proceedings of the Friends of a national bank, at their public meeting, held in Boston, fifteenth July, 1841: Including an address to the people of the U. States: showing that, to give healthful action, to the vital functions of the constitution of the United States, a national bank (not a government), invested with the powers herein described, is indispensably necessary. Boston: Dutton and Wentworth, 1841

About Degrand

External links

 WorldCat. Degrand, P. P. F. (Peter Paul Francis) 1787-1855

1787 births
1855 deaths
Businesspeople from Boston
19th century in Boston
People from Beacon Hill, Boston
19th-century French businesspeople
French emigrants to the United States
Businesspeople from Marseille
19th-century American businesspeople
Presidents of the Boston Stock Exchange